Fossil is a software configuration management, bug tracking system and wiki software server for use in software development created by D. Richard Hipp.

Features 
Fossil is a cross-platform DVCS that runs on Linux, BSD derivatives, Mac and Windows. It is capable of performing distributed version control, bug tracking, wiki services, and blogging. The software has a built-in web interface, which reduces project tracking complexity and promotes situational awareness. A user may simply type "fossil ui" from within any check-out and Fossil automatically opens the user's web browser to display a page giving detailed history and status information on that project. The fossil executable may be run as a standalone HTTP server, as a CGI application, accessed via SSH, or run interactively from the CLI.

Being distributed, Fossil requires no central server, although collaboration is made easier by using one.

Content is stored using a SQLite database so that transactions are atomic even if interrupted by a power loss or system crash.

Fossil is free software released under a BSD license (relicensed from previously GPL).

Adoption 
Fossil is used for version control by the SQLite project, which is itself a component of Fossil. SQLite transitioned to using Fossil for version control over CVS on 2009-08-12.

Some examples of other projects using Fossil are:

 Tcl/Tk Project
 Pikchr
 LuaSQLite3
 libfossil
 Androwish, the Tcl implementation for Android

Source code hosting 
The following websites provide free source code hosting for Fossil repositories:
 Chisel. Original site owner James Turner announced that the site would cease operation on May 1, 2013. After domain ownership was transferred on May 1, 2013, it continued operation.
 SourceForge (unofficially through webpages hosting service)

See also 

 Comparison of revision control software
 List of revision control software

Notes

References

Further reading

External links 
 

Bug and issue tracking software
2006 software
Cross-platform free software
Distributed bug tracking systems
Distributed version control systems
Free software programmed in C
Free version control software
Free wiki software
Software using the BSD license
Version control systems